"Winning Arrow" is a song by New Zealand singer-songwriter Bic Runga. It was released in November 2005 as the first single from her third studio album, Birds (2005).

Track listing
Vinyl (82876764811)
 A1. "Winning Arrow"	
 A2. "Say After Me"	
 B1. "Birds"	
 B2. "Somewhere in the Night"

Charts

References

External links
 Bic's official website

2005 singles
2005 songs
Bic Runga songs
Columbia Records singles
Songs written by Bic Runga